Veniamin Anatolyevich Mandrykin (born 30 August 1981) is a retired Russian professional football goalkeeper.

Career
Mandrykin trained at the youth academy at FC Alania Vladikavkaz and in 1997 turned professional aged seventeen. 

In 1998, he made his Russian Premier League debut and made 46 first-team appearances for FC Alania Vladikavkaz over the next three years before joining PFC CSKA Moscow in 2002.

He played for PFC Spartak Nalchik in the Russian Cup.

Injury
On 10 November 2010, he crashed his Porsche Cayenne SUV into a tree after trying to get away from a traffic police car in a high-speed chase. He suffered spinal fracture and injuries to his spinal cord. Two passengers in his car (two women, aged 19 and 20) received less serious injuries, breaking bones. Two of his FC Dynamo Bryansk teammates who were also in the car, Maksim Fyodorov and Marat Magkeyev, received very minor injuries.

On 21 December 2010, he was charged with drunk driving leading to injuries in connection with the incident and could face up to 3 years of imprisonment.

As of July 2017, his legs were paralyzed and his hands had very minimal movement with no expectation of further recovery. Crash-related criminal charges were dropped by agreement with other people who were injured as passengers in his car.

International
Mandrykin has represented the Russian national football team at various youth divisions, playing in the 1998 UEFA European Under-18 Championship, and won 12 caps at the Under-21 level.

He made his first appearance in the senior team for the Russian national football team in February 2003 when Russia played Cyprus.

References

External links
Player profile with UEFA

1981 births
Living people
Russian footballers
Russia under-21 international footballers
Russia international footballers
PFC CSKA Moscow players
FC Spartak Vladikavkaz players
FC Tom Tomsk players
FC Rostov players
FC Dynamo Bryansk players
Russian Premier League players
Association football goalkeepers
PFC Spartak Nalchik players